Matthew King Every (born December 4, 1983) is an American professional golfer who has won on both the PGA Tour and Nationwide Tour.

Early years

Every was born in Daytona Beach, Florida. He attended Mainland High School in Daytona Beach, where he played for the Mainland Buccaneers men's golf team. He was recognized as the Volusia County Golfer of the Year for four consecutive years, and was an all-state selection after his junior and senior seasons.

Amateur career
Every accepted an athletic scholarship to attend the University of Florida in Gainesville, Florida, where he played for coach Buddy Alexander's Florida Gators men's golf team in National Collegiate Athletic Association (NCAA) competition from 2003 to 2006.

During his career as a Gator golfer, he was a three-time first-team All-Southeastern Conference (SEC) selection (2004, 2005, 2006), and a four-time All-American (2003, 2004, 2005, 2006). As an amateur, he played in the 2005 U.S. Open at Pinehurst in North Carolina and finished in a tie for 28th place.  He was the recipient of the Ben Hogan Award, recognizing the best college golfer in the United States in 2006.

Professional career
Every turned professional after completing his NCAA eligibility in 2006. Before he found success on any major golf tour after turning professional, he competed on The Golf Channel's original series The Big Break, in Mesquite, Nevada. Every played in a select few PGA Tour and Nationwide Tour events between 2006 and 2007.  Then at Q-School in December 2007, he missed a place on the PGA Tour by just two strokes, but was rewarded with a place on the Nationwide Tour in 2008. In his second start in 2008, he finished runner-up in the Mexico Open. He finished the season with four top-10 finishes and made $180,000 in earnings, just outside the top 25 in earnings.

In his 2009 sophomore year on the Nationwide Tour, Every was ranked forty-ninth on the money list going into the Nationwide Tour Championship, needing a third-place finish or better to obtain his PGA Tour card for 2010. He had made fifteen of twenty-five cuts and had three top-10 finishes entering the season's final event. He shot a second-round 63 to take the 36-hole lead, a lead he did not relinquish. He won the event by three shots over Nationwide Tour money leader Michael Sim. The win vaulted him to tenth on the money list, and qualifying him as a PGA Tour rookie for 2010.

However, in 2010 Every finished 140th and dropped back to the Nationwide Tour for 2011.  He finished 2011 in 18th place and returned to the PGA Tour, where he has remained through 2015.

Every was one of three men arrested in a hotel in Bettendorf, Iowa and charged with possession of marijuana on July 6, 2010. In a statement, he denied possessing the drug but apologized for poor judgment. He was subsequently suspended for 90 days from the Tour.

Every earned his first PGA Tour win at the 2014 Arnold Palmer Invitational and would earn his first Masters invitation. He would go on to defend his title at the 2015 event.

On October 18, 2019, it was announced that Every had been suspended by the PGA Tour for three months for violating its conduct policy for drugs of abuse.

Personal
Every is a fan of the British group Oasis. He named his son after Liam Gallagher and has a tattoo on his right bicep with "Live Forever," which is the title of an Oasis song. His daughter Quinn Palmer is named after the site of his first PGA Tour win.

Professional wins (3)

PGA Tour wins (2)

Nationwide Tour wins (1)

Results in major championships

CUT = missed the half-way cut
"T" = tied for place

Results in The Players Championship

CUT = missed the halfway cut
"T" indicates a tie for a place

Results in World Golf Championships
Results not in chronological order before 2015.

"T" = Tied

U.S. national team appearances
Amateur
Palmer Cup: 2004, 2005 (winners)
Walker Cup: 2005 (winners)

See also

2009 Nationwide Tour graduates
2011 Nationwide Tour graduates
List of Florida Gators men's golfers on the PGA Tour

References

External links

American male golfers
Florida Gators men's golfers
PGA Tour golfers
Korn Ferry Tour graduates
Golfers from Florida
Mainland High School alumni
Sportspeople from Daytona Beach, Florida
People from Jacksonville Beach, Florida
1983 births
Living people